The Cyclo-cross de Karrantza is a cyclo-cross race held annually in Karrantza, Spain, which is rated as a C2 event on the UCI calendar.

Past winners

References

Cyclo-cross races
Cycle races in the Basque Country
Recurring sporting events established in 2003
2003 establishments in Spain